Marc Sergeant (born 16 August 1959) is a Belgian former professional road bicycle racer. He competed in the team time trial event at the 1980 Summer Olympics. He left his management role at the end of the 2021 season.
Sergeant finished a total of 6 times in the top 10 of Tour of Flanders.

Major results
Sources:

1981
 1st  Road race, National Amateur Road Championships
 2nd Ghent–Wevelgem U23
 2nd Circuit de Wallonie
 3rd Circuit des Frontières
 5th Ronde van Vlaanderen U23
1982
 1st  Overall, Vuelta a Andalucía
1st Stage 3
 1st Stage 6, Four Days of Dunkirk
 7th Paris–Roubaix
 9th Tour of Flanders
 9th Overall Tour of the Netherlands
1983
 1st Londerzeel
 2nd Road race, National Road Championships
 2nd Leeuwse Pijl
 3rd Tour of Flanders
 6th Grand Prix Eddy Merckx
 8th Polder-Kempen
1984
 1st Stage 5, Tour de Suisse
 2nd Overall Tour of Belgium
 3rd Dwars door België
 3rd Grand Prix Eddy Merckx
 9th Grote Prijs Jef Scherens
1985
 1st Oostkamp & Temse
 2nd Kuurne–Brussels–Kuurne
 3rd Druivenkoers Overijse
 8th Grand Prix Eddy Merckx
 9th E3 Prijs Vlaanderen
 10th Amstel Gold Race
1986
 1st  Road race, National Road Championships
 2nd Overall Étoile de Bessèges
1st Stage 3
 2nd Overall Tour of Belgium
 2nd Le Samyn
 4th Tour du Haut Var
 6th Dwars door België
 6th Liège–Bastogne–Liège
 6th Circuit des Frontières
 7th Paris–Roubaix
 8th Amstel Gold Race
 10th Overall Tour de Romandie
1987
 1st Stage 5, Tour de France
 1st Profronde van Almelo
 2nd Overall Ronde van Nederland
1st Stage 2
 3rd E3 Prijs Vlaanderen
 4th Overall Tour du Haut Var
 4th Overall La Méditerranéenne
 5th Tour of Flanders
 5th Road race, National Road Championships
 7th Overall Classic Brugge–De Panne
 7th Paris–Roubaix
 8th Overall Four Days of Dunkirk
 9th Omloop Het Volk
 9th Druivenkoers Overijse
1988
 1st Druivenkoers Overijse
 1st Stage 1 Euskal Bizikleta
 4th Overall Four Days of Dunkirk
 5th Overall Tour of Belgium
 5th Paris–Roubaix
 5th Amstel Gold Race
 6th Tour of Flanders
 6th Kuurne–Brussels–Kuurne
 6th De Brabantse Pijl
 7th Overall Ronde van Nederland
1st Stage 6
 7th Dwars door België
 9th Circuit des XI Villes
 10th Omloop Het Volk
1989
 1st Oostrozebeke
 3rd E3 Prijs Vlaanderen
 4th Omloop van het Leiedal
 6th Tour of Flanders
 8th Overall Tour of Belgium
 8th Circuit des Frontières
1990
 1st Stage 3 (TTT) Tour de France
 2nd Omloop van de Westhoek
 3rd Dwars door België
 5th, Wincanton Classic
1991
 6th Overall Vuelta a Andalucía
 6th Gent–Wevelgem
 6th Grand Prix de Fourmies
 7th Trofeo Luis Puig
 7th Memorial Rik Van Steenbergen
 8th Omloop Het Volk
 8th Paris–Roubaix
 8th De Kustpijl
 10th Tour of Flanders
1992
 1st De Haan
 1st Stage 4 (TTT) Tour de France
 10th Druivenkoers Overijse
1993
 4th Tour of Flanders
 7th Paris–Roubaix
 9th Dwars door België
1994
 2nd Dwars door België
 8th Tour of Flanders
1995
 4th Binche–Chimay–Binche
 5th Halle–Ingooigem
 6th Grand Prix La Marseillaise

Grand Tour general classification results timeline

References

External links 

Official Tour de France results for Marc Sergeant

1959 births
Living people
Sportspeople from Aalst, Belgium
Cyclists from East Flanders
Belgian male cyclists
Belgian Tour de France stage winners
Cyclists at the 1980 Summer Olympics
Olympic cyclists of Belgium
Tour de Suisse stage winners
Lotto–Soudal